Claire Hédon (born 5 October 1962) is a French journalist, who was appointed the 2020 Defender of Rights in France.

Early life 
Claire Hédon was born on 5 October 1962 in Paris. She is the holder of a master's degree in law from Panthéon-Assas University. She also holds a master's degree in communication from CELSA Paris.

Career 
Hedon was appointed member of the Comité consultatif national d'éthique in 2017.

She became Defender of Rights in 2020. Socialist MP George Pau-Langevin was appointed her deputy.

Hédon returned to her positions on 16 February 2021 demanding better traceability in order to fight against discrimination.

References 

1962 births
Living people
Paris 2 Panthéon-Assas University alumni
21st-century French journalists
Journalists from Paris
Ombudsmen in France
French women journalists
French radio journalists
French women radio journalists